Boni David (born 4 August 1978) is a Papua New Guinean woman cricketer. She played for Papua New Guinea at the 2008 Women's Cricket World Cup Qualifier.

References

External links 

1978 births
Living people
Papua New Guinean women cricketers